Voodoo Child is a comic book limited series published by Virgin Comics, and created by Nicolas Cage and his son Weston Coppola Cage.  

The series is written by Mike Carey with art by Dean Hyrapiet. The cover for the premiere issue was created by Ben Templesmith.

Synopsis
The story revolves around the post-Katrina setting of New Orleans, and features Voodoo mythology.  The son of a Unionist sympathizer is resurrected at his dying breath by the power of a Voodoo priest in the 1800s.  In 2005 New Orleans, Detective Robert Julien tries to solve the mystery of why several young girls have disappeared.

Collected editions
The series has been collected into a single volume:

Voodoo Child (144 pages, softcover, February 2008, hardcover, May 2008)

References

External links

Mike Carey's post about the comic
Cage and Branson open whole new comic book, The Times
Cage and son work comic 'Voodoo', USA TODAY
Preview, Comic Book Resources
Preview, Newsarama

Interviews
Nic and Weston Cage on Voodoo Child, Newsarama, July 2, 2007
The Family Voodoo: Nicolas Cage Q&A
Life and Undeath in the Big Easy: Carey Talks “Voodoo Child”, Comic Book Resources, September 11, 2007
The Virgin Days Of Mike Carey - Talking The Stranded And Voodoo Child, Newsarama, October 9, 2007